

TortoiseHg is a GUI front-end for Mercurial that runs on Microsoft Windows (on which it integrates directly with File Explorer), Mac OS X, and Linux.

It is written in PyQt (except the Windows shell extension), and the underlying client can be used on the command line.

It is often recommended and preferred for working with Mercurial on Windows.

This is a brief list of its features:
 Repository explorer
 Commit dialog
 Support for visual diff/merge tools.
 Data mining on repository contents
 Seamless support for serving a repository via Mercurial's integrated web interface.
 Repository synchronization
 Intuitive GUI for managing Mercurial settings

It is free software released under the GNU General Public License.

TortoiseHg can be used as a client to a git server.

In June 2020, TortoiseHg moved off of bitbucket when they stopped hosting mercurial projects, and found a new home with heptapod.

See also 
 TortoiseCVS, a Concurrent Versions System client for the Microsoft Windows platform
 TortoiseSVN, a Subversion client for the Microsoft Windows platform
 TortoiseGit, another Git client for the Microsoft Windows platform
 TortoiseBzr, a similar tool for use with Bazaar

References

External links 
 

Distributed version control systems
Free version control software
Free software programmed in Python
Version control GUI tools
Software that uses Qt